Maaman Magal may refer to:

Maaman Magal (1955 film) - Tamil film directed by R. S. Mani starring Gemini Ganesan, K. Savithri and J. P. Chandrababu
Maaman Magal (1995 film) - Tamil film directed by Guru Dhanapal starring Sathyaraj, Meena and Goundamani